Peter Damian Kavanagh (born 1959) is a former Australian politician, teacher, barrister and legal academic, who served as a member of the Victorian Legislative Council representing the Democratic Labor Party (DLP).

Early years
Kavanagh was born into a family with a long connection with the DLP. His maternal grandfather, Bill Barry was a key player in the Australian Labor Party split that saw the creation of the original Democratic Labor Party – a party from which the current DLP has descended although is legally separate – to the extent the party was informally dubbed "Barry Labor" in its infancy.

Education
Before entering parliament, Kavanagh attained Bachelor of Arts, Bachelor of Laws and Bachelor of Letters degrees from the University of Melbourne, and a Diploma of Education from the Mitchell College of Advanced Education. He has worked as a  barrister, law lecturer and teacher.

Kavanagh has travelled extensively within Australia and around the world, especially in East Asia. He has spent a total of more than two years in China and formally studied in Taipei, Nanjing, Beijing, Tokyo and Rome. He lectured in a college in Malaysia between 1994 and 1996. Kavanagh has working fluency in written and spoken Mandarin Chinese and retains some abilities in Japanese, Indonesian and Malay. He later obtained a Master of Arts in Asian Studies with Honours and a Graduate Diploma in Arts (Asian Studies) from the University of Melbourne.

Political career
At the 2006 Victorian election Kavanagh stood as the DLP's lead candidate in the newly formed Western Victoria Region, which elects five members via proportional representation. Despite winning only 2.5% of the vote, Kavanagh was able to win the final seat due to receiving preferences from both of the major parties.

Peter Kavanagh maintained he was attempting to use his share of the balance of power constructively, in particular encouraging the Government and Opposition to work towards and achieve agreement on some legislation.

Kavanagh led opposition within the Parliament to the decriminalisation of abortion under the Crimes Act in Victoria. In opposing the Abortion Bill 2008 Kavanagh also sent a photograph to other MPs of American Samuel Armas who, after being operated on while still in the womb, reached from inside his mother's body and grasped the surgeon's finger, in a gesture that looks like an expression of gratitude. Sending this photo prompted a storm of abuse and vitriol from some other MPs. In Parliament Kavanagh also proposed amendments to the Abortion Bill 2008 (including a requirement for pain relief for the fetus) which would have mitigated the legislation. He also made an impassioned three and a half-hour speech against the Abortion Bill (Victoria, Legislative Council (2008) Debates, 9 October, p. 4093.) which earned him extraordinarily enthusiastic, loud and sustained applause from the public gallery. His proposed amendments were all rejected however and the Bill was passed unamended by 23 to 17 votes.

Surprising many, Kavanagh has also expressed a willingness to consider gay civil unions in Victoria "providing there is a special status retained for marriage".

Kavanagh was defeated at the Victorian state elections held on 29 November 2010. The DLP was again unrepresented in the Victorian parliament until the 2014 election when Rachel Carling-Jenkins won a Legislative Council seat for the DLP.

References

External links
Peter Kavanagh's maiden parliamentary speech
Peter Kavanagh's parliamentary speech against cloning legislation
Peter Kavanagh website
DLP website

1959 births
Living people
Australian people of Irish descent
Politicians from Melbourne
Melbourne Law School alumni
Members of the Victorian Legislative Council
Democratic Labour Party (Australia) politicians
Democratic Labor Party (New) members of the Parliament of Victoria
21st-century Australian politicians
Charles Sturt University alumni